Why Did I Get Married Too? is a 2010 American comedy-drama film directed by Tyler Perry and starring Janet Jackson, Tyler Perry, Tasha Smith, Jill Scott, Louis Gossett Jr., Malik Yoba, Michael Jai White, Sharon Leal, Richard T. Jones, Lamman Rucker, and Cicely Tyson. Produced by Lionsgate and Tyler Perry Studios, it is the sequel to Why Did I Get Married? (2007). The film shares the interactions of four couples who undertake a week-long retreat to improve their relationships.

Plot
The four couples prepare for their next marriage retreat in the Bahamas. Sheila (Jill Scott) and her new husband, Troy (Lamman Rucker), are the first to arrive, followed (in order) by Patricia (Janet Jackson) and Gavin (Malik Yoba), Terry (Tyler Perry) and Dianne (Sharon Leal), and Angela (Tasha Smith) and Marcus (Michael Jai White). The men and the women separate to talk about the good and bad about their marriages. In a surprising twist, Sheila's ex-husband, Mike (Richard T. Jones), arrives, and Angela immediately starts a fight until he leaves the women alone to go see the guys.

That night, he talks about his and Sheila's relationship, which angers Troy. Dianne accidentally calls Terry "Phil" in the course of conversation. Angela is insistent about getting the password to Marcus' cell phone because she distrusts him, but Marcus distracts her using sex. Dianne and Terry hear arguing later and think it's Angela and Marcus, but it turns out to be Patricia and Gavin. When Dianne goes to investigate, she finds Patricia but cannot get her to tell her what's wrong. The next morning, Sheila makes it clear that, though Mike says he misses her, she is completely over him. At the beach, the women meet an elderly couple (Louis Gosset, Jr. and Cicely Tyson) who have accidentally thrown a friend's ashes on Angela. Sheila invites them to dinner and they accept. At the "Why Did I Get Married?" ceremony, Patricia announces to the group that she and Gavin are getting a divorce, causing a distraught and angered Gavin to walk away from her, because he did not know she was going to announce it to them.

Back in Atlanta, Gavin and his lawyer meet Patricia with her lawyer, Dianne. Patricia and Gavin have decided to split everything down the middle in the settlement, but Gavin reveals that Patricia has not offered up the account containing her $850,000 book revenue. Patricia refuses to give Gavin any of her book money, but as she leaves, Gavin advises Dianne to tell Patricia to "prepare for a fight", as he intends to get half of that account as well. Meanwhile, Angela's neighbor tells her she's been hearing sexual noises from the house when Angela is not home. Angela believes Marcus is cheating and confronts him live on his television show, who then gives her his cell phone and password. Gavin comes home very drunk and confronts Patricia. He takes their son's baby photos and taunts her about her perceived lack of emotions, even about their divorce and their son's death, and then assaults her, douses her in vodka, then burns the photos.

Elsewhere, at Sheila's request, Mike agrees to help find Troy a job. Angela lectures Dianne and Sheila about how all men cheat. Patricia changes the locks and catches Gavin, Terry, and Marcus moving Gavin's things out, then learns Gavin has taken all their money, including her book money; enraged, Patricia trashes the house with his golf clubs. Angela comes home early to catch Marcus cheating and finds a couple in her bed, but after shooting up the room, she notices it was just the gardener and the maid having sex. Terry finally confronts Dianne about her infidelity; she reveals that she has been having an emotional affair and begs for forgiveness. Marcus and Angela fight, then reconcile, but only to fight again after Angela discovers Marcus has another phone. Troy arrives at Mike's apartment after finding out Mike got him his police job. After finding Sheila there, he angrily attacks Mike. Sheila tearfully confesses that she has been taking Mike to chemotherapy; she tries to apologize for being dishonest, but he leaves her.

The women go to Patricia's house to comfort her; they soon realize that they are ruining their marriages and lives with their constant selfishness, lies, dishonesty and inconsideration. The next day, Troy, himself, apologizes to Mike for the incident, who forgives him and invites Troy to have a drink with him and the guys, beginning a new friendship. Mike tells the men to fix their marriages because life is too short. Later that day, Gavin finds himself humiliated at his job, harassed, and told off by an angry Patricia; to make matters worse, he is then struck and gravely injured by an oncoming truck. While the others wait to hear the status of his condition, a tearful and regretful Patricia instructs the wives to fix their marriages (such as Mike suggested to the husbands), and everyone makes up. Gavin's doctor shows up and informs them that he has died. The couples decided to have a memorial service for Gavin in the Bahamas.

One year later, as Patricia exits a university building she is approached by a colleague. She tells Patricia that she knows someone who wants to meet her, a philanthropist, but Patricia refuses. The professor goes on to tell her that she can at least say hi because the university needs funds. The man (Dwayne "The Rock" Johnson) tells her that her books have helped in his grieving process (divorce) and invites her to have coffee. The movie ends with Patricia smiling at him.

Cast
 Tyler Perry as Terry Brock
 Janet Jackson as Patricia Agnew
 Jill Scott as Sheila Jackson
 Sharon Leal as Dianne Brock
 Tasha Smith as Angela Williams
 Richard T. Jones as Mike
 Malik Yoba as Gavin Agnew
 Lamman Rucker as Troy Jackson
 Michael Jai White as Marcus Williams
 Louis Gossett Jr. as Porter Jones
 Cicely Tyson as Ola Jones
 Valarie Pettiford as Terry's Mom
 Dwayne Johnson as Daniel Franklin (uncredited cameo)

Production
A June 5, 2009, report stated that Janet Jackson would reprise her role as Patricia, making her the third confirmed cast member to reprise her role. Due to Michael Jackson's sudden death, film production was halted for a short period of time, after which Jackson returned to continue with the project. On August 6, 2009, Jackson stated that she had finished filming her scenes.

On June 16, 2009, Tyler Perry confirmed that the entire cast from the first film would return for the sequel.

Soundtrack
Janet Jackson recorded a song for the Why Did I Get Married Too? soundtrack entitled "Nothing". It served as the soundtrack's lead single. Also, Cameron Rafati's single "Battles" was featured in this film. Norwegian Christel Alsos was also featured with the song "Still". The soundtrack for the film was released on So So Def Recordings with distribution being handled by Malaco Records.

1. Ziggy Marley - "I Love You Too"
2. Janet Jackson - "Nothing"
3. Irma Thomas - "In The Middle Of It All"
4. Mayer Hawthorne - "A Strange Arrangement"
5. John Brown's Body - "Blazing Love"
6. Chaz Shepard - "Chemical Reaction"
7. The Falcons - "I Can't Believe It"
8. The Vanguards - "Woman Come Home"
9. Bob & Gene - "Gotta Find A Way"
10. Christel Alsos - "Still"
11. Ronnie Butler - "Married Man"
12. The Weather Girls - "It's Raining Men"

Reception

Critical response
The film received mixed reviews from critics. Based on 49 reviews collected by Rotten Tomatoes, the film has an overall approval rating from critics of 27% with an average score of 4.60/10. The website's critical consensus states, "It's bolstered by a strong performance from Janet Jackson, but ultimately, Tyler Perry's Why Did I Get Married Too? doesn't add anything new to Perry's melodramatic formula." Metacritic calculated an average score of 44/100, based on 12 reviews, indicating "mixed or average reviews". Audiences polled by CinemaScore gave the film an average grade of "A" on an A+ to F scale.

Wesley Morris of The Boston Globe gave the film 2½ out of 4 stars, claiming: "If Perry's cinematic vision remains less than 20/20, his sagacity gets stronger by the movie." Lisa Schwarzbaum of Entertainment Weekly graded the film a D, writing in her review: "It's a contradiction in terms to think of the phenomenally successful, prolific entertainment showman Tyler Perry as lazy, but there's no other description for this particular product: Terribly shot and crudely assembled." Scott Wilson concurred, stating: "Why Did I Get Married Too? lacks the underlying goodwill of some of his better work and plays like a gift wrapped present to his detractors." Wilson graded the movie 1.5/5 stars.

Box office
Why Did I Get Married Too? grossed a total of $30.2 million in its opening weekend placing second behind Clash of the Titans. Its opening weekend gross makes it the third highest opening for films created by Tyler Perry. As of June 6, 2010 the movie has grossed over $60 million domestically.

Awards/nominations
NAACP Image Awards
 2011: Nomination - Outstanding Motion Picture
 2011: Nomination - Outstanding Actress in a Motion Picture - Janet Jackson
 2011: Nomination - Outstanding Supporting Actress in a Motion Picture - Jill Scott
 2011: Nomination - NAACP Image Award for Outstanding Writing for a Motion Picture|Outstanding Writing for a Motion Picture - Tyler Perry

See also
List of black films of the 2010s

References

External links
 Official website
 
 

2010 films
2010 comedy-drama films
African-American comedy-drama films
American sequel films
Films about marriage
Films directed by Tyler Perry
Films scored by Aaron Zigman
Films shot in Atlanta
Films with screenplays by Tyler Perry
Lionsgate films
2010s English-language films
2010s American films